3d Landing Support Battalion (3d LSB) is a logistics battalion in the United States Marine Corps that supports distributed maritime operations and expeditionary advanced base operations. The unit is based out of Camp Foster, Okinawa, Japan and falls under the command of the 3rd Marine Logistics Group (3d MLG) and the III Marine Expeditionary Force (III MEF).

Mission
Supports III MEF for ship-to-shore movement during amphibious operations and terminal operations and during subsequent operations ashore in order to facilitate throughput of supplies, equipment, and personnel for sustainment via air, ground, and sea.

Table of organization
 Headquarters and Service Company.
 Landing Support Company Alpha
 Landing Support Company Bravo

History
The 3d Service Battalion was commissioned on September 16, 1942 at Camp Elliott, San Diego, California.  During World War II the battalion took part in combat operations at Bougainville, Guam, and Iwo Jima.  Following the war the battalion was decommissioned on December 28, 1945 at Marine Corps Base Camp Pendleton, California.

Unit awards
A unit citation or commendation is an award bestowed upon an organization for the action cited. Members of the unit who participated in said actions are allowed to wear on their uniforms the awarded unit citation. Awards and decorations of the United States Armed Forces have different categories: i.e. Service, Campaign, Unit, and Valor.  3d LSB has been presented with the following awards:

See also
 Logistics Combat Element
 List of United States Marine Corps battalions
 Organization of the United States Marine Corps

Citations

References
Bibliography

External links
 

3dLSB